The Golden Triangle is an economic region in Kentucky which contains most of the state's population, wealth and economic growth. In 2005 the Triangle had an estimated population of 2,253,876; which is 54% of Kentucky's population on 22% of the state's land area.  The area refers to the triangular shaped area outlined by Lexington, Louisville and Cincinnati/Northern Kentucky.

See also
Geography of Kentucky

References

Regions of Kentucky
Economic regions of the United States